Isabella Moore may refer to:

 Belle Moore (Isabella Mary Moore, 1894–1975), Scottish competition swimmer 
 Isabella Moore (soprano), New Zealand soprano singer
 Isabella Moore, establisher of the Thomas and Isabella Moore Clyde House, an NRHP-listed house in Michigan, U.S.